Alexandre Franchi is a Canadian film director from Quebec. He is most noted for his 2009 film The Wild Hunt, which won the award for Best Canadian First Feature Film at the 2009 Toronto International Film Festival and was named to the annual Canada's Top Ten list of the year's best Canadian films in 2009.

He previously directed the short films Chimère, Fata Morgana, Terminal Venus, Love Junket, and Troll Concerto.

His second feature film, Happy Face, was released in 2018.

References

External links

Film directors from Quebec
Canadian male screenwriters
Writers from Quebec
Living people
Year of birth missing (living people)
21st-century Canadian screenwriters
21st-century Canadian male writers